Kṛmilā was a Buddhist religious and administrative centre now located in what is now Lakhisarai district of Bihar.
The area is around 25–30 square kilometres and the city has a large number of historical monuments, particularly Buddhist Stupas and Hindu temples. Beglar and Cunningham explored the area and reported the antiquity of the region in the 19th century.

It is known to contain the first hilltop Buddhist monastery in the Gangetic plains.

History
The site was built sometime during the Gupta or Pāla-period in the Magadha region. The monastery at the site was known as Śrīmaddharmavihārik āryabhikṣusaṅghasya which translates as "the council of monks of Śrīmaddharma Vihāra".
The monastery was mentioned by Xuanzang during his travels through the region. He also stated that the Buddha himself stayed here.
Recent evidence has also led to speculation that the monastery was led by a female monk called Vijayaśrī Bhadra.

References

Buddhist sites in Bihar
Archaeological sites in Bihar